Perkins Pond is a small lake southwest of Rock Rift in Delaware County, New York. It drains southwest via an unnamed creek that flows into Cadosia Creek, which flows into the East Branch Delaware River. Merrick Pond is located east of Perkins Pond.

See also
 List of lakes in New York

References 

Lakes of New York (state)
Lakes of Delaware County, New York